Mark Thomas Ryan (born 29 December 1982) is an Australian Labor Party politician who has represented Morayfield in the Queensland Parliament since the 2015 election, having previously represented the seat from 2009 to 2012

Ryan was born in Nambour, Queensland, and attended St Eugene School and then St Joseph's College, Nudgee. He received a Bachelor of Laws with First Class Honours and Bachelor of Arts from the University of Queensland and became a solicitor. In 2009, he was selected as the Labor candidate for the new seat of Morayfield and was elected. He lost his seat at the 2012 Queensland state election, but regained it at the 2015 election.

In December 2015 a cabinet reshuffle placed Ryan in an extended cabinet, as Assistant Minister for State Assisting the Premier.

In November 2016, a cabinet reshuffle saw Ryan promoted to senior cabinet as the Minister for Police, Fire and Emergency Services and the Minister for Correctional Services.

References

External links
 

1982 births
Living people
Members of the Queensland Legislative Assembly
Australian Labor Party members of the Parliament of Queensland
Labor Left politicians
University of Queensland alumni
21st-century Australian politicians